The Insiders Guide To Happiness is a New Zealand drama series that explores the lives of a group of six previously unconnected people. Each life is connected by a bizarre car accident, the outcome of which forces them to examine and explore the happiness in their own lives.  It aired in 2004 on TV2 and is currently syndicated in the United States on Vibrant TV Network.  The series was followed by a prequel, The Insider's Guide To Love, with James the only character in common.

Cast
Will Hall – James
Fasitua Amosa – Matthew
Ben Barrington – William
Fraser Brown – Sam
Sophia Hawthorne – Julie
Samantha Jukes – Tina
Paolo Rotondo – Tim
Madeleine Sami – Tess
Sally Stockwell – Lindy
Loren Horsley – Olive
Jeremy Randerson – Grant

Episode list
 Is Happiness an Accident?
 Who Controls Your Happiness?
 Will the Truth Make You Happy?
 What Are You Afraid Of?
 Are You In Denial?
 Do You Deserve To Be Happy?
 What If You Could Start Over?
 Will You Be Happy Tomorrow?
 Who Taught You To Be Happy?
 Being Happy is Being Who You Are
 Does Happiness Grow Up?
 Can You Embrace A New Life?
 You Are Happy

Awards
At the 2005 New Zealand Screen Awards, the show won the following seven awards:

 Best Drama Series
 Best Actor
 Best Supporting Actor
 Best Supporting Actress
 Best Script (Single Episode of a Drama Series or Serial)
 Best Directing (Drama/Comedy Programme)
 Best Original Music

References

External links
 (archived 2008)

2004 New Zealand television series debuts
2004 New Zealand television series endings
Insider's Guide To Happiness
Insider's Guide To Happiness
TVNZ 2 original programming
Television shows funded by NZ on Air